The Blackmailers or Blackmailing a Bullfighter (Spanish:Chantaje a un torero) is a 1963 Spanish crime film directed by Rafael Gil and starring Manuel Benítez 'El Cordobés', Alberto de Mendoza and Manolo Morán.

Cast
 Manuel Benítez 'El Cordobés' as Juan Medina  
 Alberto de Mendoza as Vergara 'El Americano'  
 Manolo Morán as Don Fulgencio, apoderado de Juan  
 María Andersen as Wilma, turista alemana 
 Elena Duque as Marta, novia de Juan  
 Luis Dávila as Don Andrés, el sacerdote  
 Venancio Muro as El Tinta  
 Carlos Mendy 
 José Mata 
 José María Seoane 
 Manuel Alexandre 
 Luis Induni 
 Antonio Casas 
 José María Caffarel 
 Juan Cortés 
 Hugo Pimentel 
 Yelena Samarina as Belly, turista inglesa 
 José Morales 
 Mercedes Borqué 
 Fernando Liger

References

Bibliography
 de España, Rafael. Directory of Spanish and Portuguese film-makers and films. Greenwood Press, 1994.

External links 

1963 films
1963 crime films
Spanish crime films
1960s Spanish-language films
Films directed by Rafael Gil
Suevia Films films
Films produced by Cesáreo González
1960s Spanish films